Masoud Rigi is an Iranian professional footballer who plays as a defensive midfielder for Sepahan.

Club career

Club career statistics

International

In 2012, Rigi was called up by Carlos Queiroz to participate in an Iran national under-23 football team training camp in preparation for the Asian Cup world qualifiers beginning in June of that year.

References

External links
Profile on Persianleague

Living people
Iranian footballers
1991 births
Association football midfielders
Esteghlal F.C. players
Shahr Khodro F.C. players
Fajr Sepasi players
People from Shiraz
Sportspeople from Fars province